Kakuna may refer to:

 Kakuna (Pokémon), a generation I Pokémon
 Kakuna, Estonia, a village in Saaremaa
 Kakuna (planthopper), a genus in the family Delphacidae